The following is a list of Texas cities, towns, and census-designated places in which a majority (over 50%) of the population is Hispanic or Latino, according to data from the 2010 Census.

Cities with over 500,000 people
El Paso (80.7%)
San Antonio (63.2%)

Cities with 100,000 to 499,999 people
Brownsville (93.2%)
Corpus Christi (59.7%)
Laredo (95.6%)
McAllen (84.6%)

Cities with 25,000 to 99,999 people
Del Rio (84.1%)
Edinburg (88.2%)
Harlingen (79.5%)
Kingsville (71.4%)
Mission (85.4%)
Odessa (50.6%)
Pharr (93.0%)
Rosenberg (60.3%)
San Juan (96.7%)
Socorro (96.7%)
Weslaco (85.0%)

Communities with 10,000 to 24,999 people

Cities with 10,000 to 24,999 people
Alamo (78.10%)
Alice (85.1%)
Beeville (71.9%)
Donna (92.3%)
Dumas (50.5%)
Eagle Pass (95.5%)
Freeport (59.9%)
Galena Park (81.4%)
Hereford (71.7%)
Jacinto City (83.9%)
Mercedes (91.9%)
Port Lavaca (56.6%)
Richmond (54.4%)
Rio Grande City (94.3%)
Robstown (93.6%)
Rosenberg (60.3%)
San Benito (90.7%)
Seguin (55.4%)
South Houston (88.1%)
Uvalde (78.4%)

Unincorporated Census Designated Places with 10,000 to 24,999 people
Aldine (82.1%)
La Homa (97.1%)
San Elizario (98.7%)

Communities with fewer than 10,000 people

Cities with fewer than 10,000 people
Agua Dulce, Nueces County (99.2%)
Alpine (51.2%)
Alton (93.6%)
Arcola (62.4%)
Asherton (92.9%)
Austwell (57.29%) (now 44.9%)
Balcones Heights (74.5%)
Balmorhea (83.7%)
Barstow (78.5%)
Benavides (91.4%)
Big Lake (62.4%)
Big Wells (94.1%)
Bishop (67.5%)
Bovina (82.3%)
Brackettville (75.7%)
Cactus (74.1%)
Carrizo Springs (89.6%)
Charlotte (75.1%)
Cockrell Hill (90.7%)
Cotulla (87.3%)
Crystal City (97.1%)
Dell City (66.3%)
Devine (60.0%)
Dilley (73.3%)
Dimmitt (68.6%)
Driscoll (83.5%)
Earth (63.8%)
Edcouch (97.8%)
Eden (68.5%)
El Cenizo (99.2%)
Eldorado (61.3%)
Elmendorf (64.7%)
Elsa (97.8%)
Encinal (89.6%)
Falfurrias (92.0%)
Floresville (65.1%)
Floydada (61.6%)
Fort Stockton (73.7%)
Freer (82.0%)
Friona (69.9%)
George West (50.6%)
Granjeno (99.7%)
Gregory (90.9%)
Hale Center (63.2%)
Hart (74.62%)
Hidalgo (98.4%)
Hondo (63.5%)
Horizon City (85.9%)
Impact (71.4%)
Jourdanton (54.8%)
Karnes City (65.3%)
Kenedy (68.6%)
Kress (61.7%)
La Feria (85.0%)
La Grulla (98.1%)
La Joya (97.6%)
La Villa (96.9%)
LaCoste (60.4%)
Lamesa (58.7%)
Lorenzo (59.0%)
Los Fresnos (88.2%)
Los Ybanez (73.7%)
Lyford (98.3%)
Lytle (65.6%)
Marfa (68.7%)
Martindale (56.5%)
Mathis (91.6%)
McCamey (59.4%)
Mobile City (77.7%)
Morton (61.6%)
Muleshoe (64.3%)
Natalia (83.6%)
New Home (52.7%)
New Summerfield (71.5%)
Nixon (76.3%)
Odem (79.2%)
O'Donnell (62.8%)
Olton (69.5%)
Orange Grove (51.2%)
Palacios (60.4%)
Palmhurst (78.7%)
Palmview (97.2%)
Pearsall (85.1%)
Pecos (83.2%)
Peñitas (98.2%)
Petersburg (65.8%)
Pleasanton (56.3%)
Port Isabel (76.5%)
Poteet (87.0%)
Premont (84.5%)
Presidio (93.8%)
Progreso (98.4%)
Ralls (58.0%)
Raymondville (86.9%)
Rio Bravo (98.9%)
Rio Hondo (84.5%)
Roma (94.8%)
San Diego (94.0%)
San Perlita (93.9%)
Seagraves (65.6%)
Sinton (71.6%)
Smiley (67.0%)
Somerset (67.0%)
Sonora (62.7%)
Spofford (63.2%)
Stanton (55.4%)
Sullivan City (99.6%)
Taft (75.5%)
Uhland (61.2%)
Waelder (77.6%)
Wilson (57.3%)

Towns with fewer than 10,000 people
Anthony (69.4%)
Christine (74.4%)
Clint (89.8%)
Combes (77.6%)
Estelline (51.7%)
Lockney (58.7%)
Los Indios (95.5%)
Meadow (59.5%)
Miller's Cove (85.2%)
Plains (58.1%)
Poth (57.1%)
Primera (88.7%)
Rocksprings (74.5%)
Runge (74.17%)
Santa Rosa (97.0%)
Toyah (51.1%)
Valentine (58.2%)
Van Horn (79.5%)
Woodsboro (53.4%)

Villages with fewer than 10,000 people
Rangerville (85.8%)
Vinton (94.4%)

Unincorporated Census Designated Places with fewer than 10,000 people
Abram-Perezville (81.59%)
Agua Dulce, El Paso County (95.12%)
Airport Road Addition (88.2%)
Alfred-South La Paloma (57.43%)
Alice Acres (92.2%)
Alto Bonito (97.36%)
Alton North (97.51%)
Arroyo Alto (98.12%)
Arroyo Colorado Estates (96.56%)
Arroyo Gardens-La Tina Ranch (96.45%)
Batesville (95.3%)
Bausell and Ellis (84.82%)
Bixby (79.4%)
Bloomington (74.4%)
Blue Berry Hill (82.3%)
Bluetown-Iglesia Antigua (93.79%)
Boling-Iago (50.83%)
Botines (81.82%)
Bruni (89.4%)
Butterfield (93.0%)
Cameron Park (99.3%)
Cantu Addition (95.7%)
Canutillo (90.8%)
Carrizo Hill (95.5%)
Catarina (79.7%)
Cesar Chavez (93.9%)
Chula Vista-Orason (91.37%)
Chula Vista-River Spur (78.25%)
Cienegas Terrace (95.17%)
Citrus City (98.72%)
Concepcion (100.0%)
Coyanosa (97.5%)
Coyote Acres (88.2%)
Cuevitas (100.0%)
Cumings (68.7%)
Del Mar Heights (96.5%)
Del Sol-Loma Linda (87.33%)
Doffing (96.4%)
Doolittle (98.1%)
Edgewater-Paisano (68.68%)
Eidson Road (98.9%)
El Camino Angosto (94.9%)
El Indio (88.9%)
El Refugio (94.3%)
Elm Creek (98.0%)
Encantada-Ranchito El Calaboz (98.2%)
Encino (93.0%)
Escobares (98.72%)
Fabens (96.8%)
Falcon Heights (94.3%)
Falcon Lake Estates (82.5%)
Faysville (98.6%)
Fifth Street (94.8%)
Flowella (94.9%)
Fort Hancock (95.4%)
Fronton (100%)
Garceno (86.0%)
Grand Acres (100%)
Green Valley Farms (96.9%)
Guerra (66.7%)
Havana (99.3%)
Hebbronville (92.8%)
Heidelberg (96.8%)
Homestead Meadows North (89.5%)
Homestead Meadows South (97.7%)
Indian Hills (96.6%)
K-Bar Ranch (71.5%)
Knippa (61.0%)
La Blanca (95.4%)
La Casita-Garciasville (99.13%)
La Feria North (70.8%)
La Paloma (92.09%)
La Paloma-Lost Creek (73.8%)
La Presa (99.4%)
La Pryor (90.5%)
La Puerta (98.72%)
La Rosita (98.8%)
La Victoria (97.1%)
Lago (100%)
Laguna Heights (86.2%)
Laguna Seca (98.9%)
Laredo Ranchettes (100%)
Larga Vista (96.77%)
Las Colonias (91.52%)
Las Lomas (89.6%)
Las Lomitas (95.1%)
Las Palmas-Juarez (96.10%)
Las Quintas Fronterizas (98.7%)
Lasana (82.1%)
Lasara (95.0%)
Laureles (96.5%)
Lindsay, Reeves County (88.9%)
Llano Grande (82.7%)
Loma Linda East (94.86%)
Lopeno (89.21%)
Lopezville (98.7%)
Los Alvarez (100%)
Los Angeles Subdivision (94.19%)
Los Ebanos (98.01%)
Los Villareales (96.45%)
Lozano (92.1%)
Lyford South (98.84%)
Medina (97.7%)
Midway North (98.6%)
Midway South (94.4%)
Mila Doce (98.9%)
Mirando City (95.2%)
Monte Alto (94.7%)
Morales-Sanchez (92.9%)
Morgan Farm Area (61.78%)
Morning Glory (98.0%)
Muniz (99.8%)
New Falcon (98.4%)
North Alamo (93.0%)
North Escobares (100%)
North Pearsall (84.2%)
North San Pedro (98.3%)
Nurillo (96.70%)
Oilton (97.5%)
Olivarez (97.9%)
Olmito (98.8%)
Owl Ranch-Amargosa (93.93%)
Ozona (68.2%)
Palmview South (84.0%)
Pawnee (90.05%)
Pettus (54.11%)
Prado Verde (68.7%)
Quemado (93.5%)
Radar Base (95.8%)
Ranchette Estates (96.1%)
Ranchitos Las Lomas (97.4%)
Rancho Alegre (95.7%)
Rancho Banquete (93.9%)
Rancho Chico (88.9%)
Ranchos Penitas West (98.1%)
Ratamosa (73.39%)
Realitos (92.82%)
Redford (90.0%)
Redwood (88.1%)
Reid Hope King (97.7%)
Relampago (94.7%)
Roma Creek (99.7%)
Rosita North (98.15%)
Rosita South (83.14%)
St. Paul, San Patricio County (71.6%)
Salineno (99.34%)
San Carlos (98.5%)
San Ignacio (92.97%)
San Isidro (90.8%)
San Manuel-Linn (73.80%)
San Pedro (96.56%)
Sanderson (51.4%)
Sandia (65.7%)
Sandy Hollow-Escondidas (59.5%)
Santa Cruz (100%)
Santa Maria (99.5%)
Santa Monica (84.3%)
Scissors (97.5%)
Sebastian (94.6%)
Seth Ward (74.4%)
Sierra Blanca (73.1%)
Siesta Shores (93.6%)
Skidmore (62.8%)
Solis (84.0%)
South Alamo (99.0%)
South Fork Estates (97.1%)
South Point (97.5%)
Sparks (99.1%)
Spring Garden-Terra Verde (97.11%)
Study Butte-Terlingua (51.69%)
Taft Southwest (95.5%)
Tierra Bonita (95.7%)
Tierra Grande (82.4%)
Tornillo (98.7%)
Tradewinds (82.2%)
Tynan (74.8%)
Uvalde Estates (91.8%)
Val Verde Park (91.8%)
Villa del Sol (95.4%)
Villa Pancho (96.3%)
Villa Verde (95.2%)
West Pearsall (99.71%)
West Sharyland (98.2%)
Westway (97.3%)
Willamar (100.0%)
Yznaga (95.6%)
Zapata Ranch (98.1%)
Zapata (95.0%)

References

See also
 List of U.S. communities with Hispanic majority populations

Hispanic
Texas geography-related lists
Demographics of Texas